Dersu Uzala (alternate U.S. titles: With Dersu the Hunter and Dersu the Trapper) is a 1923 memoir by the Russian explorer Vladimir Arsenyev, concerning his travels in the Russian Far East with the Goldi hunter Dersu Uzala.

The story was made into a 1975 film Dersu Uzala, directed by Akira Kurosawa.

Plot
Arsenyev tells of his travels in the Ussuri basin in the Russian Far East. Dersu Uzala (c. 1849–1908) was a Goldi hunter who acted as a guide for Arsenyev's surveying crew mapping the taiga from 1902 to 1907 and saved them from starvation and cold. Arsenyev portrays him as a simple yet great man, an animist who sees animals and plants as equal to man. From 1907, Arsenyev invited Dersu to live in his house in Khabarovsk as Dersu's failing sight hampered his ability to live as a hunter. In the spring of 1908, Dersu bade farewell to Arsenyev and walked back toward his home in the woods of the Primorsky Krai; he was killed before he could reach them, near the town of Korfovskiy, evidently for the highly valuable latest model Russian military rifle given to him by Arsenyev as a parting gift to replace his old, worn, Berdianka. He was buried in a hastily dug grave, unmarked but for Dersu's walking stick, stuck in the earth beside it by a heartsick Arsenyev.

Editions in Russian
Дерсу Узала. Сквозь тайгу Издательство: Терра - Книжный клуб (1997) Н. Е. Кабанова (ed.)  (English: Dersu Uzala.  Taiga Publishing House: Terra Book Club) (1997) N. ya. Kabanov (ed.) )

English translations
With Dersu the Hunter: Adventures in the Taiga adapted by Anne Terry White
Pub: George Braziller 1965, A Venture Book, New York. 
Dersu the Trapper translated by Malcolm Burr
Pub: Secker & Warburg, London 1939. First English edition.
Pub: E. P. Dutton & Co., Inc. New York: 1941.  First American edition.
Pub: McPherson and others, 1996, 2001. . Mass market paperback.
Dersu Uzala translated by Victor Shneerson
Pub: Foreign Languages Publishing House, Moscow, ca 1950
Pub: Raduga Publishers, Moscow 1990, 
Pub: University Press of the Pacific 2004

Film adaptations
1961 - Dersu Uzala (Дерсу Узала) Soviet Union, director Agasi Babayan [Агаси Бабаян]
1975 - Dersu Uzala (Дерсу Узала) Soviet Union/Japan, director Akira Kurosawa

External links
 Dersu Uzala Info

1923 non-fiction books
Soviet novels
Primorsky Krai